Yacine Dekkiche is a French rugby league and rugby union footballer who played in the 1990s and 2000s. He represented France at the 2000 Rugby League World Cup.

Playing career
Dekkiche originally played rugby league and in 2000 played for Huddersfield-Sheffield in the Super League. Between 1999 and 2000 he played in four matches for France, including one at the 2000 World Cup.

In 2001 Dekkiche switched codes to rugby union, joining La Rochelle in the Top 16. Between 2005 and 2010 Dekkiche played for a variety of clubs in both the Rugby Pro D2 and Fédérale 1 divisions. He currently plays for Saint-Jean-d'Angély.

References

Living people
French rugby league players
France national rugby league team players
1980 births
Huddersfield Giants players
French rugby union players
Rugby league wingers
Rugby league centres
Rugby union centres
Stade Rochelais players
Place of birth missing (living people)
French expatriate sportspeople in England